Ewa Urszula Kamińska-Eichler (born 17 May 1953 in Elbląg) is a Polish sprint canoeist who competed in the late 1970s and early 1980s. Competing in two Summer Olympics, she earned her best finish of fourth in the K-1 500 m event at Montreal in 1976.

References
 Sports-reference.com profile

1953 births
Canoeists at the 1976 Summer Olympics
Canoeists at the 1980 Summer Olympics
Living people
Olympic canoeists of Poland
Polish female canoeists
People from Elbląg
Sportspeople from Warmian-Masurian Voivodeship
20th-century Polish women